Otto, Duke of Brunswick-Grubenhagen (1320 – 1 December 1398) was the fourth and last husband of Joanna I of Naples. He also held the title of Prince of Taranto. His nickname was Otto the Tarantine.

Biography
Otto was the eldest son of Henry II, Duke of Brunswick-Grubenhagen (c. 1289 – 1351) and Jutta of Brandenburg.

In 1353, he married Violante of Vilaragut, a daughter of Berengar de Vilaragut and widow of James III of Majorca. There were no children from this marriage. By 1372, Otto was a widower. On 25 September 1376, Otto married his second wife, the three times widowed Queen Joanna I of Naples. The groom was fifty-six years old and the bride about forty-eight. The marriage was childless.

The so-called Western Schism started in 1378 with the election of two rival popes, Urban VI of Rome and Clement VII of Avignon. Joanna supported Clement VII and allied herself with his main supporter Charles V of France. With no hope of having further children of her own, Joanna chose to strengthen her alliance with France by adopting Louis of Anjou, younger brother of Charles V, as her heir.

Urban VI proclaimed Joanna deposed in 1381. He named her second cousin Charles of Durazzo as his candidate for the supposedly vacant throne. Charles spent the following months gathering his army within the Kingdom of Hungary and then marched against the Kingdom of Naples. Otto led the Neapolitan army in battle but was defeated. Otto was exiled from Naples by the new king and never returned. Joanna was strangled in prison in the Castle of San Fele on 12 May 1382.

Otto survived Joanna by at least sixteen years but never remarried. He died childless at Foggia and was succeeded by his first cousin, once removed Eric I, Duke of Brunswick-Grubenhagen, previously Duke of Einbeck.

External links

His profile in Peerage.com

1320 births
1398 deaths
Kings consort
Princes of Grubenhagen
Royal consorts of Naples
Old House of Brunswick
Husbands of Joanna I of Naples